Coral reef restoration strategies use natural and anthropogenic processes to restore damaged coral reefs. Reefs suffer damage from a number of natural and man-made causes, and efforts are being made to rectify the damage and restore the reefs. This involves the fragmentation of mature corals, the placing of the living fragments on lines or frames, the nurturing of the fragments as they recover and grow, and the transplantation of the pieces into their final positions on the reef when they are large enough.

Background
Coral reefs are important buffers between the land and water and help to reduce storm damage and coastal erosion. They provide employment, recreational opportunities and they are a major source of food for coastal communities. It is estimated that $375 billion dollars come from ecosystem services provided by coral reefs each year.

The most prevalent coral in tropical reefs are the stony corals Scleractinia that build hard skeletons of calcium carbonate which provide protection and structure to the reef. Coral polyps have a mutualistic relationship with single-celled algae referred to as zooxanthellae. These algae live in the tissue of coral polyps and provide energy to the coral through photosynthesis. In turn, the coral provides shelter and nutrients to the zooxanthellae. 

Half the world's coral since 1970 have disappeared, and all reefs being threatened with extinction by 2050. In order to ensure the existence of coral reefs in the future, new methods for restoring their ecosystems are being investigated. Fragmentation is the most common strategy for restoring reefs; often used to establish artificial reefs like coral trees, line nurseries, and fixed structures.

Threats to coral reefs 
Some anthropogenic activities, such as coral mining, bottom trawling, canal digging, and blast fishing, cause physical disruption to coral reefs by damaging the corals' hard calcium carbonate skeletal structure.

Another major threat to coral reefs comes from chemical degradation. Marine pollution from sunscreens, paints, and inland mining can introduce chemicals that are toxic to corals, leading to their decay. Coral disease is often prevalent in areas where coral are stressed, and has increased in severity in recent decades. Often a result of pollution, eutrophication can occur in coral reef ecosystems, limiting nutrients from the corals. With changes happening on coastal lands such as deforestation, mining, farm soil tiling and erosion, much more sediments are entering the water column. This is known as sediment loading, which can directly smother the coral, or block UV light, effectively blocking the coral from photosynthesizing. 

Additionally, increased CO2 emissions from human activities such as fossil fuel burning can effect the acidity of ocean waters. Ocean acidification occurs when excess CO2 reacts with ocean water and lowers the pH. Under acidic conditions, corals cannot produce their calcium carbonate skeletons, and certain zooxanthellae are not able to survive.

Perhaps the biggest threat to coral reefs comes from rising global temperatures. Most corals can only tolerate a 4-5 °C range in water temperatures. Under these adverse conditions, corals may expel their zooxanthellae and become bleached. As ocean waters warm beyond the tolerated temperature range, corals are dying. One study of the Great Barrier Reef found the reef mortality rate to be 50% after an extreme heatwave with 3-4 °C temperature increase. Due to bleaching events similar to this one, injured corals continue to die after the event due to increased disease susceptibility, it takes decades after bleaching events for the reef to recover, and the slow growing corals are put under an immense amount of stress.

Propagation methods

Marine Based 
Fragmentation is a method used to divide a wild colony of coral into smaller fragments, and these smaller pieces are grown into additional coral colonies. These fragmented colonies are genetically identical to the host colony. Up to 75% of the host colony may be removed without negative effect on its growth rate. This allows researchers to move forward with restoration projects with minimal impact, if any at all, on the growth rate or survivorship of the original colony.  Fragmentation practices are used in virtually every kind of coral restoration strategy used today. Several different methods of growing fragmented corals are outlined below.

Fragmentation allows for about an 8x increase in productivity compared to that of the original donor coral. The amount of fragmentation done to the donor coral is determined based on the amount of space available for attachment. Although fragmentation has great potential, it should be avoided when risk for disease and storms are high as it increases the potential risks from these stressors. This strategy may not be optimal for certain species that are less adapted to fragmentation or have slower growth rates.

In vertical line nurseries, coral fragments are tied to a line suspended in the water. One end of the line is attached to a buoy while the other is anchored to the seafloor. The corals in this type of nursery are linked directly to the vertical line in the water column.

In suspended line nurseries, two vertical line nurseries are placed apart from each other so they are parallel vertically in the water column. They are then connected together with rope tied perpendicularly between the two. Coral is then attached to this rope, but it is partially dangling off the lines so there is less contact with the rope itself. Less contact between the coral and the suspension lines leads to lower the partial mortality of the corals. Although these structures have some partial mortality, studies show high survival of the whole nursery (in both vertical and suspended). Raising corals on line structures increases the distance between the coral colonies and potential predators, benthic diseases, and there is less space to compete for. Corals grown in line nurseries need to be moved to fixed substrates after an initial growth period, while those propagated on fixed structures can grow indefinitely. 

Fixed structure nurseries are frames attached to the seafloor. These nurseries are often made from materials like PVC, plastic mesh, and cinder blocks.

There are likely no differences in growth rates between corals grown horizontally in fixed nurseries, versus those grown vertically in line nurseries. Although, the survival rate of these nurseries are lower than line nurseries. A 2008 study found that fixed structure nurseries had a 43% survival rate, while line nurseries had a 100% survival rate. Initial mortality of fixed structure nurseries is also likely dependent on the time of year that the corals are transplanted. It is important to limit stressors that newly grafted corals are exposed to.

A “coral tree” is the first type of nursery of its kind where coral is completely suspended in the water column. Low cost and availability of materials to create these coral trees make them an ideal method for propagation. These nurseries are less susceptible to damage from wave action, there is less interaction between benthic predators and disease, and reduced entanglement risk for other marine life (compared to line nurseries). Because these nurseries are only anchored in one place, there is minimal impact to the seafloor, they are portable and easily transported by one person, and they can be easily adjusted if depth is an issue.

Land-based 

Land-based coral nurseries allow coral to grow to a reasonable size before out-planting. Tanks filled with circulating sea water provide an artificial place for coral seedlings to grow. Similar to plant nurseries, a coral nursery provides protection from storms, predation and other stressors as they grow. It is also a place to selectively breed for resistant genotypes. Techniques in growing coral on land can involve sexual and asexual reproduction of coral. When used together, coral specimen can be grown with higher resilience to stressors and fast growth rates.

Asexual Coral Reproduction 
Coral are able to reproduce asexually when one polyp undergoes budding to produce another clonal polyp. A technique called micro-fragmentation was developed by Dr. David Vaughan in 2006, which uses the coral's ability to clone itself for coral production. Micro-fragmentation is the process of creating small (>1cm) pieces of live coral from a parent coral colony.  These pieces are then affixed to a ceramic or cement base called a plug and placed in land nursery tanks. 

Massive reef-building coral are the prime species used in this method, because it speeds up their growth rate. Rather than waiting decades for a coral to grow to a robust size, months are needed to see viable specimen. This is due to the quick healing response of coral. During micro-fragmentation, wounded edges are created where the colony is severed. These heal quickly by expanding their size radially outward, colonizing their plugs and eventual out-planting sites in the ocean. Fusion of multiple fragments of the same genotype can result in a larger area of coral cover.

Sexual Coral Reproduction 
Coral reproduce sexually through broadcast spawning. Coral larvae are formed in the water column through the fertilization of suspended gamete bundles.  In a land-based nursery, control over which specimen reproduce can allow for selective breeding of more resilient coral. 

Availability of coral gametes in the wild is highly dependent on environmental factors. Studies have shown that most spawning happens at the same time of evening, and depends on lunar cycles. Recent work has been attempting to trigger coral spawning in the nursery environment by mimicking these environmental controls.

Restoration strategies 

Coral restoration has been occurring for over 40 years. 
 When determining which restoration strategy is best for a given location, it is important to compare and contrast all methods. The effectiveness of a strategy can be dependent on the habitat a nursery resides in, the conditions of the environment, how the conditions vary annually, and the structure of the nursery chosen.

Coral gardening for reef restoration, on any scale, may not be capable of saving a depleted species. Instead, restoration strategies should be used to aid natural recovery in the re-establishment of a larger genetic pool of a species of coral. This allows corals to sexually reproduce and recover naturally with time. Coral gardening and propagation of corals is important because it is much easier for a fragment of coral to survive than it is for the early life-stage of coral to establish itself in reef environments.

Creating repositories for corals can aid in species reintroduction after coral die-off events. Not only do these repositories serve as a method for recovery, but they can also greatly enhance the genetic pool of isolated populations of corals. Through enhancing these genetic pools, we can expect higher future survival rates for the corals.  One study found used an Acropora cervicornis (A. cervicornis) nursery as a repository after an extreme cold-water event occurred that wiped out roughly 43% of its population in the area. The reintroduction of corals from these repositories reintroduced healthy coral tissues to the coral population, aiding in natural reproduction.

These practices should be used simultaneously with practices such as watershed management, sustainable fishing practices, and the establishment of Marine Protected Areas. Coral gardening also offers indirect benefits, like the rapid creation of new fish and invertebrate habitat on depleted reefs. These reef restoration methods also create citizen science opportunities, getting the community involved in coral restoration and conservation.

See also
Coral Reef
Marine protected area
Biorock

References

Coral reefs
Wildlife conservation
Ecological restoration